Dr. Richard Ward (born 1957) joined the Ardonagh Group, in September 2018 as Executive Chairman of Specialty. Ardonagh are one of the world's leading independent insurance brokers.
Ward is on the Board of Direct Line Group plc as the Senior Independent Non-Executive Director and Chair of the Remuneration Committee, having joined in January 2016.

Prior to Ardonagh, Ward was Executive Chairman of Cunningham Lindsey from June 2014. Cunningham Lindsey is a provider of claims management and risk services, with over 7,000 employees in 60 countries.

In addition to Cunningham Lindsey, Ward served as Non-Executive Chairman of Brit plc, a specialty insurer and reinsurer, from 2014 until 2018. Ward also served as a Non-Executive Director of Partnership Assurance Group plc between 2013 and 2016 and was a member of the PRA Practitioner Panel, Bank of England from 2015 until 2020.

Prior to these roles, Ward was Chief Executive of Lloyd's of London, from 2006 to 2013.

Ward previously worked for over ten years at the London-based International Petroleum Exchange (IPE), the second largest energy trading exchange - re-branded ICE Futures, as both Chief Executive Officer and Vice-Chairman.

Prior to the IPE, Ward held a range of senior positions at British Petroleum (BP) and was Head of Marketing & Business Development for energy derivatives worldwide at Tradition Financial Services.

Between 1982 and 1988, Ward worked as a Senior Physicist with the Science and Engineering Research Council, leading a number of research development projects.

He is married with two children and lives in London.

Education
He graduated from the University of Exeter with a BSc, 1st Class Hons in Chemistry and holds a PhD in physical chemistry.

Career
His initial career was as an applied scientist, first for the government agency SERC, at the Rutherford Appleton Laboratory near Oxford and later for British Petroleum, where he moved into management.

He was Chief Executive of the International Petroleum Exchange (IPE) from 1999-2005 and Vice Chairman from 2005-2006.

He was the longest serving CEO at Lloyd's,  during which time, he led a transformation of the business and introduced digitisation of many of the processes, particularly in claims.

As Executive Chairman of Cunningham Lindsey from 2014-2018, he led a major transformation and restructure of the business and carried out a successful trade sale of Cunningham Lindsey to Sedgwick.

As Non-Executive Chairman of Brit Insurance, he took the company public in 2014 and led a successful sale of the company in February 2015.

As a member of the PRA Practitioner Panel he served as rotating Chair of the insurance Sub-Committee, an independent statutory panel which represents the interests of practitioners regulated by the Bank of England.

References

External links
 Richard Ward: The transformer, Insurance Day, January, 2015
 Cunningham Lindsey has London targeted in TPA push, Insurance Insider, November, 2014
 Q&A: Richard Ward: Passing the Lloyd's Baton, Post Online, October, 2013
 Dr Ward: Insurers face backlash over bank scandals, the Insurance Times, Sept,2013
 Lloyd's of London CEO Ward sets out moves away from risk amid euro fears, The Telegraph, May, 2012
 Arctic Oil Rush Will Ruin Ecosystem, Warns Lloyd's of London, The Guardian, April, 2012

1957 births
Living people
British chief executives